The Moku Daihatsu Class or 15m landing craft was a type of landing craft, used by the Imperial Japanese Army during World War II. It was similar to the Landing Craft, Vehicle, Personnel (LCVP), with a bow ramp that was lowered to disembark cargo upon riding up onto the beach. It was constructed of a plywood hull and powered by a gasoline engine.

The landing craft had problems with the plywood decomposing quickly in the tropics.

References
Jentschura, Hansgeorg; Jung, Dieter; and Mickel, Peter. Translated by Brown, J.D. 1977. Warships of the Imperial Japanese Navy, 1869–1945. Naval Institute Press. .
Merriam, Ray. 2006. Japanese Landing Craft of World War II. Bennington, VT: Merrian Press. 

Landing craft